The Memphis Railroad & Trolley Museum is located at 545 South Main Street on the ground floor of the Central Station in Memphis, Tennessee, USA. The museum is dedicated to document the local history of Railroad and the Memphis Trolleys. The museum provides static exhibits as well as video documentation and railroad model dioramas.

Staff
The museum is operated as a non-profit organisation and is staffed by volunteers.

See also
 Central Station (Memphis)
 MATA Trolley
 List of museums in Tennessee

References

Museums in Memphis, Tennessee
Railroad museums in Tennessee
History museums in Tennessee
Street railway museums in the United States
Museums with year of establishment missing
Charities based in Tennessee